Indonesia has competed at every of the ASEAN Para Games which was first held in Kuala Lumpur, Malaysia in 2001 ASEAN Para Games.

Medal tables
*Red border color indicates tournament was held on home soil.

Medals by Games

References

Indonesia
ASEAN Para Games